Los hijos de Guillermo Tell (The Sons of William Tell) is a compilation album by Carlos Varela.

It was produced in 2004 for Abdala Studio, Havana, Cuba.

Track listing
"Como los peces"
"Muros y puertas"
"Robinson"
"Nubes"
"Como un angel"
"Monedas al aire"
"Ahora que los mapas cambian de color"
"Graffiti de amor"
"El humo del tren"
"Una palabra"
"Pequeños sueños"
"Jalisco Park"
"Siete"
"Habaname"
"Foto de familia"
"Guillermo Tell"

2004 compilation albums
Carlos Varela albums